Love Always Wins is the sixth studio album by American singer Kem. It was released by Motown Records on August 28, 2020. The album marked Kem's first full-length project in six years.

Critical reception

Andy Kellman, writing for AllMusic, found that Kem "returns with a reliably mellow, romantic, and gently uplifting album that embraces his role in adult contemporary R&B and at the same time more openly displays his inspirations and stretches out [...] Love Always Wins is more scuffed and groove-oriented than any previous Kem album."

Track listing

Charts

Release history

References

2020 albums
Kem (singer) albums